Thomas Roger Cooper (January 17, 1927 – October 9, 1985) was an American professional baseball catcher in the Negro leagues, and minor leagues. He played in the Negro leagues with the Kansas City Monarchs from 1947 to 1952. He played in the Philadelphia Phillies minor league system with the Schenectady Blue Jays in 1953 and 1957, and the Trois-Rivieres Phillies in 1954.

References

External links
 and Seamheads

1927 births
1985 deaths
Kansas City Monarchs players
Schenectady Blue Jays players
Trois-Rivières Phillies players
Baseball players from Missouri
Sportspeople from Missouri
20th-century African-American sportspeople
Baseball catchers